RPS Rajah Soliman (D-66) was a destroyer escort/frigate that served with the Philippine Navy between 1960 and 1964. A , it was originally named  during its previous service with the United States Navy. It was the first destroyer escort to be operated by the Philippine Navy, and is the only member of its class ever operated by the service. Rajah Soliman  was also the flagship of the Philippine Navy during its time in commission, which ended with the sinking of the vessel in 1964.

Acquisition and service
The ex- was transferred to the Philippine Navy on 31 October 1960, as a loan under the terms of the Military Assistance Program; on 21 April 1961, the ship was sold outright to the Philippines. Rajah Soliman served as the Philippine Navy's flagship during her service life. In June 1964, the ship entered a refit period at the Bataan National Shipyard, located in Mariveles, Bataan, for repairs to her engine.

Sinking, raising, and disposal
On 29 June 1964, Typhoon Winnie, also known as Typhoon Dading, hit the Bataan Peninsula; the storm surge associated with the cyclone struck Rajah Soliman, which was at the time docked at the shipyard's pier. The storm battered the ship's superstructure and starboard side against the pier, causing Rajah Soliman to capsize and sink at the dock. The effects of the storm also caused the wreck to fill with mud, sand and other debris.

After the storm, an attempt to salvage the ship was made by the Philippine Navy; the attempt failed as a result of the necessary equipment not being available. After the vessel had been successfully raised, it was towed to the Ship Repair Facility at Subic Naval Base, located nearby.

A survey of the raised Rajah Soliman'' found that the ship had been damaged beyond economical repair. Designated for disposal, the hulk was sold for scrapping on 31 January 1966 to Mitsubishi International Corp.

References

Frigates of the Philippine Navy
Ships transferred from the United States Navy to the Philippine Navy
1943 ships
Maritime incidents in 1964